Cavagna is an Italian surname. Notable people with the surname include:

Angela Cavagna (born 1966), Italian showgirl, model, and television personality
Armando Cavagna (born 1955), Italian engineer
Giovan Battista Cavagna (c.1545–1613), Italian architect
Giovanni Cavagna (born 1934), Italian physiologist 
Giovanni Paolo Cavagna (1550-1627), Italian painter
Guido Cavagna (born 1917-?), Swiss politician
Janis Cavagna (born 1995), Italian football player 
Marco Cavagna (1958-2005), Italian astronomer
Matteo Cavagna (born 1984), Italian footballer
Matteo Cavagna (born 1985), Italian footballer
Rémi Cavagna (born 1995), French professional cyclist

See also
10149 Cavagna, asteroid

Italian-language surnames